A thermostatic mixing valve (TMV) is a valve that blends hot water with cold water to ensure constant, safe shower and bath outlet temperatures, preventing scalding.

The storage of water at high temperature removes one possible breeding ground for Legionella; the use of a thermostat, rather than a static mixing valve, provides increased safety against scalding, and increased user comfort, because the hot-water temperature remains constant.

Many TMVs use a wax thermostat for regulation. They also shut off rapidly in the event of a hot or cold supply failure to prevent scalding or thermal shock. 

Water above these temperatures can cause scald injuries. Installing thermostatic mixing valves can ensure that water is delivered at the required temperature, thereby reducing the risk of scalding accidents; it also reduces hot water consumption from a supply that is maintained at a higher temperature.

There are three main categories for water temperature controlling devices: Heat Source, Group Control, and Point-of-Use.  

Heat Source
These are used with central heating systems that use water as a medium.
 Tempering valves for use on hot water heat distribution systems
 High flow rates suitable for use in under floor (radiant) heating applications 
 Allows water to be stored at a higher temperature

Group Control
These provide a uniform distribution temperature for all hot water outlets in a household.
 Designed for multi-point applications
 Temperature stability

Point-of-Use
These are single Outlet Thermostatic Mixing Valves, often called "thermostatic faucets", "thermostat taps" or "thermostat valves".
 Designed for single point applications, such as individual showering, hand wash basin mixers, bath or tub fillers
 High level protection against scalding and thermal shock

Although other temperature regulating valves exist, thermostatic mixing valves are the preferred type in health care facilities, as they limit maximum outlet temperature, regardless of pressure or flow.

See also 

 Thermostatic radiator valve
 Pressure-balanced valve

References
Thermostatic mixing valve patent

External links 
Thermostatic Mixing Valve Manufacturers Association

Plumbing
Temperature control